Archery at the 2024 Summer Paralympics will be held at Esplanade des Invalides in Paris. It consists of nine events (3 men, 3 women, 3 mixed open teams). It will be expected that there would be 140 archer slots.

Qualification

A total of 140 archer slots will be achieved.

Medalists

See also
Archery at the 2024 Summer Olympics

References

2024 Summer Paralympics events
2024
International archery competitions hosted by France